Studenčice is a small settlement in the hills east of Medvode in the Upper Carniola region of Slovenia.

Cultural heritage
 A 2 m granite obelisk standing in a meadow north of Studenčice no. 64, east of the road from Studenčice to Tehovec, commemorates the TV G-25 Partisan courier station. The obelisk was designed by Janez Omerza and installed on 5 October 1980. The TV G-25 courier station is also commemorated by a plaque on the front of the house at Studenčice no. 34.

References

External links

Studenčice on Geopedia

Populated places in the Municipality of Medvode